Enzo Maidana (born 13 January 1988) is an Argentinian footballer, who plays for Peruvian club Alianza Universidad.

Club career
On 27 July, he joined Incheon United.

References

External links

1988 births
Living people
Argentine footballers
Argentine expatriate footballers
Primera Nacional players
Categoría Primera B players
Paraguayan Primera División players
Bolivian Primera División players
K League 1 players
Venezuelan Primera División players
Ecuadorian Serie A players
Peruvian Primera División players
Atlético Tucumán footballers
Juventud Antoniana footballers
Deportivo Pereira footballers
Club Rubio Ñu footballers
Club Petrolero players
Incheon United FC players
Academia Puerto Cabello players
C.S.D. Independiente del Valle footballers
Nacional Potosí players
Alianza Universidad footballers
Argentine expatriate sportspeople in South Korea
Argentine expatriate sportspeople in Colombia
Argentine expatriate sportspeople in Paraguay
Argentine expatriate sportspeople in Bolivia
Argentine expatriate sportspeople in Venezuela
Argentine expatriate sportspeople in Ecuador
Argentine expatriate sportspeople in Peru
Expatriate footballers in South Korea
Expatriate footballers in Colombia
Expatriate footballers in Paraguay
Expatriate footballers in Bolivia
Expatriate footballers in Venezuela
Expatriate footballers in Ecuador
Expatriate footballers in Peru
Association football forwards
Sportspeople from San Miguel de Tucumán